Jamy Amarilis Franco Núñez (born 1 July 1991) is a Guatemalan race walker. Cuban coach Rigoberto Medina has worked with her since 2010.

Born in Santa Rosa, Franco is the daughter of former Olympic race walker Evelyn Núñez. In 2005 at the age of 14, Franco won the 10,000 meter race walk at the Pan American Junior Athletics Championships in Windsor, Canada, setting a new record in the event. The following year, aged 15, she won the 4000 m race walk in the Central American and Caribbean Junior Championships, under-17 category, again setting a competition record.

In March 2011, she won the Pan American Race Walking Cup, her first major title, and in August 2011 at the World Championships she finished in 19th place in the 20 km event, being the top ranked woman from the Americas and setting high expectations for the Pan American Games competition later that year.

On 23 October 2011, at the age of 20, she won the 20 km race walk at the Pan American Games in Guadalajara, Mexico, breaking the Pan American Games women's record in the process and finishing the event 59 seconds ahead of her compatriot Mirna Ortíz, who finished second. It was the first time in the games' history that Guatemala won gold and silver medals in the same athletic event. It was also Guatemala's first win in an athletics event at the Games since Mateo Flores won the Marathon in the 1955 edition.

At the 2012 Memorial Mario Albisetti she set a 20 km walk best of 1:30:57 hours, taking fourth place overall.

Achievements

References

External links
 

1991 births
Living people
Guatemalan female racewalkers
Athletes (track and field) at the 2011 Pan American Games
People from Santa Rosa Department, Guatemala
Athletes (track and field) at the 2012 Summer Olympics
Olympic athletes of Guatemala
Pan American Games gold medalists for Guatemala
Pan American Games medalists in athletics (track and field)
Medalists at the 2011 Pan American Games